Anamon Hyeren Standard School is located at Tutuka of the Obuasi Municipal District in the Ashanti Region of Ghana. It is a mixed school (both boys and girls). It admits pupils from nursery to the junior high school level.

See also

 Education in Ghana
 List of schools in Ghana

References

Educational institutions with year of establishment missing
Ashanti Region
Schools in Ghana